Ali Al-Sebaa (Arabic: علي السبع; born May 4, 1951) is a Saudi Arabian actor, best known for his role in the Arabian series Fars Al-Janop. He has won thirty-two awards, including Best Actor of the Year in 1980 from the Culture and Arts Association.

His first role
Al-Sebaa started his acting career in 1974 in Saudi television. His first role was in the series Fars Al-Janop, which also featured Muna Wassef, Adnan Barkat, and Asad Fathah.

Personal life 
Al-Sebaa is married and has six children.

Acting works

Plays 
 Anbar Ako billal
 Bayat mn lef    
 Zwage beljmlah  
 Alkorah Al-motah
 Al-Millionaire  

Series
Faras AlJanop in 1974
Juha
 Kaznah
Hamath wq helo
 Ayalt Abu Kalash
Al-Shatr Hussan 
Wagah bin Fhar   
Wadan ya sadiki  
Aswar            
Al-Saknat Fe Klobna

Movies
Al-Salaef 
Alsagip
Keif al-Hal?

References 

1951 births
People from Eastern Province, Saudi Arabia
Living people
Saudi Arabian male film actors
Saudi Arabian male stage actors
Saudi Arabian male television actors
People from Saihat